News24 is an English-language South African news website created in October 1998 by the multinational media company, Naspers. Its team of approximately 100 journalists, led by editor-in-chief Adriaan Basson, are based in Cape Town, Johannesburg, Pretoria, Durban and Gqeberha. Its brands include Fin24, Sport24, Channel24, Health24, Arts24, Parent24, Wheels24, W24, Ride24 and Business Insider SA. News24 is owned by Media24, a South African media company, with interests in digital media and services, newspapers, magazines, e-commerce, book publishing, print and distribution. In August 2021, News24 launched a digital subscription service that offers premium investigative journalism, opinion, analysis and more to paying subscribers at R75 per month. It currently has more than 40 000 subscribers.

History 
News24 was launched in October 1998 as part of Naspers’ new internet strategy under the company's new managing director at the time, Koos Bekker. According to the APP Annie's business intelligence report, in 2000 it become the most known South African media of the Internet 1.0, which was already at that time realized with a web user interface. News24 enabled third-party websites to create landing pages for paid advertisement.

Arrie Rossouw was appointed News24's first publisher. News24 focused on breaking local news, while relying on wire copy for international news. 
Initially based in Johannesburg, News24 relocated to Cape Town in 2001 to form part of the newly created Media24 Digital division under the leadership of Russell Hanly. The move was brought on by the restructuring of Media24's digital operations. Soon the need to restructure arose, and News24's employees were cut from 30 to 18, with Douw Steyn as business manager and Cobus Heyl as editor.
In April 2020 News24 launched the first mobile version of the website, a new desktop one, and provided a free subscription option which offered 20 newsletters, personalized traffic alerts, weather forecasts and bookmarked articles.

References

External links 
 

South African news websites
Internet properties established in 1998
1998 establishments in South Africa